The Old Frontier is a 1950 American Western film directed by Philip Ford and written by Robert Creighton Williams. The film stars Monte Hale, Paul Hurst, Claudia Barrett, William "Bill" Henry, Tristram Coffin and William Haade. The film was released as a Fawcett Movie Comic#6 on July 20, 1950, by Republic Pictures.

Plot

Cast
Monte Hale as Barney Regan
Paul Hurst as Skipper Horton
Claudia Barrett as Betty Ames
William "Bill" Henry as Doctor Tom Creighton
Tristram Coffin as John Wagner
William Haade as Henchman Pills
Victor Kilian as Judge Ames
Lane Bradford as Henchman Spud
Denver Pyle as Henchman George
Almira Sessions as Mrs. Smedley
Tom London as Banker

References

External links 
 

1950 films
American Western (genre) films
1950 Western (genre) films
Republic Pictures films
Films directed by Philip Ford
Films adapted into comics
American black-and-white films
1950s English-language films
1950s American films